The men's Continental style was one of three archery events on the Archery at the 1908 Summer Olympics programme. The event was held on 20 July. NOCs were limited to 30 competitors each, though none came close to this maximum.

Just as the British dominated the York round archery, the French dominated the Continental-style. The one Briton to formally enter placed 12th, while the American placed 15th. However, "several" of the British archers who had competed in the double York round event also joined in the shooting for this event without competing for medals. One, Robert Backhouse, shot a score of 260. He received a Diploma of Merit for the accomplishment, which would have earned a silver medal had he been shooting in competition.

Louis Vernet and Henri Berton each hit the target with all 40 arrows. Eugène Grisot, Gustave Cabaret, Charles Aubras, and Louis Salingre each missed only once.

Competition format

Each archer shot 40 arrows, with the target 50 metres distant. Arrows were shot singly. Each hit was worth 9, 7, 5, 3, or 1 points depending on which ring was hit; an arrow touching two rings would count as hitting the higher value. Ties were broken first by number of hits, then by number of golds (hits in the 9-point ring).

Results

References

Sources
 Official Report of the Games of the IV Olympiad (1908).
 De Wael, Herman. Herman's Full Olympians: "Archery 1908". Accessed 8 April 2006.

Men's Continental style
Men's events at the 1908 Summer Olympics